The 1960 Cornell Big Red football team was an American football team that represented Cornell University during the 1960 NCAA University Division football season. Cornell tied for last place in the Ivy League . 

In its 14th and final season under head coach George K. James, the team compiled a 2–7 record and was outscored 167 to 78. Warren Sundstrom was the team captain. 

Cornell's 1–6 conference record tied for seventh place in the Ivy League. The Big Red were outscored 132 to 55 by Ivy opponents. 

Cornell played its home games at Schoellkopf Field in Ithaca, New York.

Schedule

References

Cornell
Cornell Big Red football seasons
Cornell Big Red football